The Greenwich Township School District is a comprehensive community public school district that serves students in pre-kindergarten through eighth grade from Greenwich Township, in Warren County, New Jersey, United States.

As of the 2018–19 school year, the district, comprised of two schools, had an enrollment of 686 students and 67.3 classroom teachers (on an FTE basis), for a student–teacher ratio of 10.2:1.

The district is classified by the New Jersey Department of Education as being in District Factor Group "I", the second-highest of eight groupings. District Factor Groups organize districts statewide to allow comparison by common socioeconomic characteristics of the local districts. From lowest socioeconomic status to highest, the categories are A, B, CD, DE, FG, GH, I and J.

Public school students in ninth through twelfth grades attend Phillipsburg High School in Phillipsburg, which serves students from the Town of Phillipsburg as part of a sending/receiving relationship with the Phillipsburg School District. The high school also serves students from four other sending communities: Alpha, Bloomsbury (in Hunterdon County), Lopatcong Township and Pohatcong Township. As of the 2018–19 school year, the high school had an enrollment of 2,324 students and 197.5 classroom teachers (on an FTE basis), for a student–teacher ratio of 11.8:1.

In 2016, the Bloomsbury School District announced that it was pursuing a $30,000 study to consider merger / consolidation with the Greenwich Township School District, citing the "financial instability" the Bloomsbury district faces based on the way the Phillipsburg district calculates the costs for students sent for high school. The notice to residents announcing the feasibility study stated that the Greenwich district was chosen based on the quality of its academic programs, shared superintendent and business administrator, proximity, financial stability and shared sending relationship with Phillipsburg for high school.

Schools
Schools in the district (with 2018–19 enrollment data from the National Center for Education Statistics) are:
Greenwich Elementary School with 426 students in grades pre-kindergarten to 5
Nichole Hutnik, Principal
Stewartsville Middle School with 258 students in grades 6 - 8 
Joel Barrett, Principal

Administration
Core members of the district's administration are:
Maria Eppolite, Superintendent of Schools
Tim Mantz, School Business Administrator / Board Secretary

Board of education
The district's board of education, comprised of nine members, sets policy and oversees the fiscal and educational operation of the district through its administration. As a Type II school district, the board's trustees are elected directly by voters to serve three-year terms of office on a staggered basis, with three seats up for election each year held (since 2014) as part of the November general election. The board appoints a superintendent to oversee the district's day-to-day operations and a business administrator to supervise the business functions of the district.

References

External links
Greenwich Township School District
 
Data for the Greenwich Township School District, National Center for Education Statistics
Phillipsburg High School

Greenwich Township, Warren County, New Jersey
New Jersey District Factor Group I
School districts in Warren County, New Jersey